Solanum adscendens, the sonoita nightshade, is a plant native to the Americas. It has been found in Mexico, Costa Rica, El Salvador, Guatemala, Honduras, Nicaragua, Bolivia, Colombia, Ecuador, Paraguay, Corrientes in Argentina, Bahia and Rio Grande do Sul in Brazil, and Texas and Arizona in the United States. In addition, this plant has also been naturalized in parts of Africa.

S. adscendens is a predominantly selfing species with very small white flowers that mature into fruits that disperse their seeds by exploding.

References

 Solanum adscendens Sendtn. on Solanaceae Source - Images and specimens. Full descriptions and identification keys coming soon!

adscendens
Flora of Arizona
Flora of Mexico
Flora of Costa Rica
Flora of El Salvador
Flora of Guatemala
Flora of Honduras
Flora of Nicaragua
Flora of Brazil
Flora of Bolivia
Flora of Colombia
Flora of Ecuador
Flora of Argentina
Flora of Paraguay